Arandas may refer to:
 Arandas (crater), a crater on Mars, named after Arandas, Jalisco

Also, it may refer to the following administrative divisions: 
 Arandas, Ain, a commune in the department of Ain, France
 Arandas, Jalisco, a municipio (municipality) and township of Jalisco, Mexico
 Arandas, Guanajuato, a municipio (municipality) in Irapuato, Mexico